The Banque du Congo Belge (1909-1960), Banque Belgo-Congolaise also known as Belgolaise (1960-2012), Banque du Congo (1960-1971), Banque Commerciale Zaïroise (1971-1997), and Banque Commerciale Du Congo (BCDC, 1997-2020) all refer to a banking group that operated mainly in the Belgian Congo from 1909 to 1960, the Republic of the Congo (Léopoldville) from 1960 to 1964, the Democratic Republic of the Congo from 1964 to 1971, Zaire from 1971 to 1997, and the Democratic Republic of the Congo from 1997 to 2020, going through a number of reorganizations over more than a century. In 2012, Brussels-based Belgolaise was wound down by its then owner Fortis Group, and in 2020, Kinshasa-based BCDC merged with Equity Bank Congo (EBC) to form Equity Banque Commerciale du Congo.

Background

Following King Leopold II's creation of the Congo Free State in 1885, his colonial secretary Albert Thys in 1886 formed the Compagnie du Congo pour le Commerce et l'Industrie (CCCI) to exploit the territory's resources. On , on Thys's initiative, the Compagnie Internationale pour le Commerce et l'Industrie (CICI) was formed in Brussels with shareholders that mostly included Belgian banks led by the Société Générale de Belgique (SGB), as well as some French investors led by the Banque de Paris et des Pays-Bas, German investors led by Deutsche Bank, and British investors led by the Stern Brothers, Ernest Cassel, and Vincent Caillard. The chairman was initially the SGB's , and Thys was its managing director. It was hosted next to the CCCI on rue de Brederode, next to the Royal Palace of Brussels and across the street from its annex the so-called Norwegian chalet, built a few years later to host the Free State's offices. Rather than a bank, the Banque d'Outremer acted as an investment company that invested into projects in Congo but also Canada, China, the Dutch East Indies, and Russia.

Banque du Congo Belge

The  was founded in 1909 with sponsorship from the Banque d'Outremer, and initially hosted within the latter's head office complex. In 1954, it moved to a new head office on Cantersteen 1 above the North–South connection in central Brussels, designed by architects .

Banque Belgolaise

With the independence of Congo in 1960, the Banque du Congo Belge restructured its European activities as the Banque Belgo-Congolaise, known from 1965 as Belgolaise. The activities in Congo were reorganized as Banque Commerciale Du Congo, with Belgolaise, the Congolese state, and private partners as BCDC's shareholders.

Belgolaise Bank expanded into other African markets in the late 1980s and 1990s, and in the late 1990s was acquired by Fortis Group. In the 2000s, Fortis was unable to find a buyer, and started to liquidate it in 2005. The liquidation was completed by BNP Paribas Fortis in 2018.

Banque Commerciale du Congo

The BCDC was renamed Banque Commerciale Zaïroise when the country's name was changed. With the collapse of the country's economy and the long civil war starting in 1997, the bank sharply reduced the size of its activities. In 2004, taking advantage of the improved socio-political climate and the subsequent economic upturn, BCDC redeployed its network throughout the country and adapted its sales organization. BCDC became a bank of reference in the DRC, active throughout the country. From 2009, it was controlled by George Arthur Forrest. By year-end 2016, it earned $11 million US dollars before tax, making it the highest result in 15 years. In 2017, BCDC operated twenty three branches in seventeen cities in the DRC. Including 10 in Kinshasa, 4 in the former Katanga Province, and one in each of the following cities : Aru, Beni, Boma, Bukavu, Bunia, Butembo, Durba, Goma, Kananga, Kimpese, Kisangani, Lukala, Matadi, Mbuji-Mayi and Isiro. The Kananga agency, in Kasai Central, was located on Boulevard Lumumba.

On 9 September 2019, Equity Group Holdings Limited, a Kenyan-based banking group, announced that it had acquired a controlling stake in BCDC from George Forrest. In December 2020, Equity Bank Group, having received regulatory approval from the DR Congolese regulators, began the process of merging BCDC with Equity Bank Congo (EBC), to form Equity Banque Commerciale du Congo (Equity BCDC), where the group maintained 77.5 percent shareholding.

References

External links
 Official site
 

Banks of the Democratic Republic of the Congo
Companies based in Kinshasa
1909 establishments in the Belgian Congo
Defunct banks of Belgium